Šalčininkai (Solechnik) is a city in Vilnius County, Lithuania, situated south-east of Vilnius, near the border with Belarus.

The name of the city derives from Šalčia river, than means in Lithuanian language šalta – cold (waters, river). The region around Šalčininkai was inhabited by Lithuanians and it is one of the centres where forefathers of written Lithuanian language were born (including Stanislovas Rapalionis, Jurgis Zablockis and ), but during the course of history, the demographics changed (partially due to language shift and through acculturation) and now in the environs of Šalčininkai, uncodified Belarusian vernacular (called po prostu by the locals) is widespread and the city itself is considered the most important provincial centre of Polish culture in Lithuania (the urban centre being Vilnius).

Šalčininkai attained the town status in 1956 and is now a capital of the Šalčininkai district municipality. According to the latest census of 2021, Šalčininkai had 6857 inhabitants and features a multi-ethnic population of 4930 Poles (71.9%), 920 Lithuanians (15.7%), 438 Russians (6.4%), 286 Belarusians (4.2%), 61 Ukrainians (0,9%) and 222 people of other background (3.2%). 12.2% of all inhabitants in Šalčininkai district municipality, according to the 2021 census were born abroad, while 87.8% were born in Lithuania. This was a decrease from 14.3%, recorded by the previous – 2011 census. Out of 34.5 thousand inhabitants in 2011, 3711 or 10.7% of all the inhabitants were born in Belarus, 728 or 2.1% in Russia.  Šalčininkai contains the highest percentage number of Poles of any town in Lithuania. The town's coat of arms, designed by Arvydas Každailis, shows three hazelnuts symbolizing solidarity of the population.

Notable people
 Władysław Kozakiewicz (born 1950), Polish pole vaulter and Olympic champion
 Henoch Leibowitz
 Aaron Soltz

Twin towns – sister cities

Šalčininkai is twinned with:

 Ashmyany, Belarus
 Bełchatów County, Poland
 Hude, Germany
 Kastrychnitski (Minsk), Belarus
 Kadzidło, Poland
 Kaźmierz, Poland
 Kętrzyn County, Poland
 Lahoysk, Belarus
 Lida, Belarus
 Łomża, Poland
 Łowicz, Poland
 Nowe Miasto Lubawskie, Poland
 Płońsk, Poland
 Radom County, Poland
 Stare Miasto, Poland
 Świdnik, Poland
 Szczytno, Poland
 Tarnowo Podgórne, Poland
 Voranava, Belarus
 Warsaw West County, Poland
 Wolsztyn County, Poland
 Wschowa, Poland
 Żnin, Poland

References 

 
Cities in Lithuania
Cities in Vilnius County
Municipalities administrative centres of Lithuania
Vilnius Voivodeship
Vilensky Uyezd
Wilno Voivodeship (1926–1939)
Šalčininkai District Municipality